The 2020 Bhutan Premier League was the ninth season of the unified league, rebranded as the Bhutan Premier League since 2019 (previously the Bhutan National League), the top national football competition in Bhutan, having replaced the A-Division in 2013.

The Bhutan Football Federation implemented the same league structure as in the 2019 season. The top division was named Bhutan Premier League (BPL). The other division was named Bhutan Super League (BSL), replacing Thimphu League as a qualifying competition for the Premier League. The lowest division was named Dzongkhag League where teams played in their respective districts (Dzongkhags) to gain promotion to the Super League.

Super League

The 2020 Bhutan Super League featured eight teams, one fewer than last season. One more team from Dzongkhag League was promoted instead of dissolved Phuentsholing United.

Teams

Teams returning from 2019 Bhutan Super League

Druk Stars
High Quality United
Paro United
BFF Academy U-17 (previous season U-16)

Teams promoted from 2019 Dzongkhag League

CST
Paro Rinpung
Punakha Gomo
Tensung

Regular season
The regular season was played in single round-robin format. It started on 6 February, which was delayed from the scheduled start of 1 February, and ended on 11 March.

Playoffs
The playoffs were played from 14 to 21 March.

First semi-final

Second semi-final

Third semi-final

Final

Premier League
The 2020 Bhutan Premier League featured eight teams, two fewer than last season. The league started on 1 August 2020, after a delay due to the COVID-19 pandemic in Bhutan, and most matches were played behind closed doors. On 11 August 2020, the league was suspended until further notice due to the nationwide lockdown. It has resumed again from 17 September 2020.

Teams 

Top four teams of 2019 Bhutan Premier League
Paro
Transport United
Thimphu City
Ugyen Academy

Top four teams of 2020 Bhutan Super League
High Quality United
Tensung
Paro United
Druk Stars

BFF Academy U-19 (fifth in 2019 Bhutan Premier League), Druk United (sixth in 2019 Bhutan Premier League), and BFF Academy U-17 (fifth in 2020 Bhutan Super League) all withdrew.

League table

References

External links
Facebook page of Bhutan Football Federation
Facebook page of Bhutan Premier League
RSSSF

Bhutan National League seasons
Bhutan
1
Bhutan Premier League, 2020